Sebree Station is the informal name given to a group of three coal-fired power plants co-located together in the northeast corner of Webster County, near Sebree, Kentucky. They are owned and operated by the Big Rivers Electric Corporation.

Overview
Sebree Station comprises
 Henderson Station Two
 Robert D. Green Generating Station
 Robert Reid Power Station

See also
 Coal mining in Kentucky

References

Coal-fired power plants in Kentucky
Buildings and structures in Webster County, Kentucky